Matt Charman (born June 5, 1979) is a British screenwriter, playwright, and producer from Horsham, West Sussex. He was nominated for an Academy Award for Best Original Screenplay for his 2015 film Bridge of Spies, directed by Steven Spielberg and co-written with Joel and Ethan Coen. Charman started out writing for theatre, making a breakthrough as writer-in-residence at the National Theatre in London, where then-director Nicholas Hytner described Charman as having "a priceless nose for a story".

Plays
Charman's first play, A Night at the Dogs, won the 2004 Verity Bargate Award for emerging writers and appeared at Soho Theatre. He went on to write The Five Wives of Maurice Pinder (2007) and The Observer (2009), about a UN election observer's intervention in a West African nation's political crisis. Both were produced and staged at the National Theatre. In 2012, Charman's play Regrets, starring Ansel Elgort opened at the Manhattan Theatre Club in New York. Set in McCarthy-era America, the play follows four men in a Nevada desert boarding house waiting out the six weeks required for a no-fault divorce. The Machine, directed by Josie Rourke, opened at the Manchester International Festival in 2013 and then transferred to the Park Avenue Armory in New York. The play told the story of Garry Kasparov's defeat to IBM’s chess computer Deep Blue in 1997, the first time a computer beat a reigning chess world champion under tournament conditions.

Future theatre projects for Charman include an adaptation of Good Night, and Good Luck for the stage, and a play for Nicholas Hytner's new London Theatre Company.

Television
Charman’s television work includes Our Zoo (2014) for the BBC, which tells the story of the founding of Chester Zoo, famous for having no bars. In 2015, Charman’s police drama Black Work, starring Sheridan Smith aired on ITV. The show was ITV's biggest new drama of the year.

Films
Charman's first feature was Suite Française (2014) co-written with director Saul Dibb, starring Michelle Williams, Kristin Scott Thomas and Margot Robbie. His 2015 feature, Bridge of Spies, was directed by Steven Spielberg, co-written by Charman and Joel and Ethan Coen and starred Tom Hanks, Mark Rylance, and Amy Ryan. Set in Brooklyn and Berlin, the film tells the story of James B. Donovan, an American lawyer who in 1962 negotiated the exchange of Soviet spy Rudolf Abel for the captured pilot of a downed U-2 spy plane, Francis Gary Powers, and American student Frederic Pryor. The film was critically acclaimed, with the New York Times calling it “a consummate entertainment that sweeps you up with pure cinema.” and the New York Post calling it Spielberg's best film since Saving Private Ryan. Charman's script was nominated for Best Original Screenplay at both the 2016 Academy Awards and BAFTA Awards. He was also nominated for a WGA award and Critics' Choice award in the same category. Bridge of Spies was a box office hit, grossing $165.5 million worldwide and receiving six Academy Award nominations including Best Picture and Best Original Screenplay, winning Best Supporting Actor for Mark Rylance's performance as Rudolf Abel.

Charman wrote a second screenplay for Steven Spielberg's Amblin Partners, based on Walter Cronkite’s 1968 visit to Vietnam.

Producing
Charman runs his own production company, Binocular which is based in London. He was executive producer on Operation Finale (2018), written by Matthew Orton, about the hunt for Adolf Eichmann. The film was directed by Chris Weitz.

Charman is currently executive producer on Liberty, written by Neil Widener and Gavin James, an adaptation of George Koskimaki’s book "The Battered Bastards of Bastogne" for Fox 2000 about a key conflict during the Battle of the Bulge. Charman is also executive producing another upcoming film written by Widener and James, Battle of Alcatraz.

Personal life and early career
Charman was born and raised around the location of Horsham, West Sussex, England, and his family were from Great House Farm in Southwater, where his father's side of the family had lived for 180 years. The family moved to the hamlet of Dragon's Green when Charman was 4 years old. Charman attended junior school in Southwater, getting involved in school plays from a young age. Charman continued his interest in drama at comprehensive secondary school at Forest School, Horsham, getting involved with rehearsals and with stage and lighting equipment. He was involved with the performances of The King and I and My Fair Lady whilst a student of Forest School, Horsham.

He then went on to study English literature at University College London. While a student, he frequently snuck into plays and musicals for free during intervals (a practice known as second-acting), and "tried to figure out what happened in the first act". In the mid-2000s, Charman did uncredited script work for Roland Emmerich's films 2012 and 10,000 BC.

Awards and honours
 2004 – Verity Bargate Award for his debut play A Night at the Dogs
 2005 – Attachment at the Soho Theatre
 2005 – Peggy Ramsay Award
 2006 – Attachment to the Royal National Theatre Studio
 2008 – Pearson Writer in Residence at the National Theatre
 2009 – Catherine Johnson Award for The Observer
 2016 – Nominated for the Academy Award for Best Original Screenplay

References

External links
 

Living people
British dramatists and playwrights
People from Horsham
British male screenwriters
British male dramatists and playwrights
1979 births
People from Southwater